The Civic Tower is a high-rise building located at 1926 West Burnside Street in Portland, Oregon, United States. Construction began in 2005, and was completed in 2007.

References

External links
 The Civic Condos of Portland

2007 establishments in Oregon
Buildings and structures completed in 2007
Buildings and structures in Portland, Oregon
Southwest Portland, Oregon